Phrynobatrachus nanus is a species of frog in the family Phrynobatrachidae. Common name Buala river frog has been coined for this species.

Taxonomy
Phrynobatrachus nanus was described by German zoologist Ernst Ahl in 1925 as Pararthroleptis nanus based a single specimen, the holotype. Phrynobatrachus nanus is the type species of the genus Pararthroleptis Ahl, 1925 "1923". However, the genus is currently considered a synonym of Phrynobatrachus.

Description
Phrynobatrachus nanus has an indistinct tympanum. There are two metatarsal tubercles. The dorsum is olive-brownish and has six to eight greyish flecks, about as large as the eye. The thighs have three or four bands.

Ecology
There are no observations of this species after its discovery, and its ecology is essentially unknown.

References

nanus
Frogs of Africa
Amphibians of the Central African Republic
Endemic fauna of the Central African Republic
Amphibians described in 1925
Taxa named by Ernst Ahl
Taxonomy articles created by Polbot